Owendale is a town in Kgatelopele Local Municipality in the Northern Cape province of South Africa. It is located between Postmasburg and Daniëlskuil.

An old mining town, it was owned by Pieter du Toit from 1998 to 2006, when it was auctioned. He had reportedly bought the settlement as a base for Gemeente van die Verbondsvolk, a religious cult. Members of the congregation wished to live in an isolated village, but the dearth of available jobs led to the disintegration of the community. Asbestos mining operations had ceased in 1993.

Louis Theroux visited the town as part of his 2000 Weird Weekends documentary series, in which the town is described as being for "whites only".

See also
 Morgenzon
 Balmoral, Mpumalanga

References

Populated places in the Kgatelopele Local Municipality
Intentional communities in South Africa